Duke Street is a street in Glasgow, Scotland. It runs from the city centre to the East End, from High Street through the residential district of Dennistoun, past The Forge Shopping Centre, meeting the Gallowgate, Tollcross Road and Westmuir Street to form a turreted Edwardian junction at Parkhead Cross. It takes its name from the Duke of Montrose.

From 1460 to 1870, the original buildings of the University of Glasgow were located at the junction of High Street and Duke Street before it moved to the West End. The site was then turned into the College Goods yard by the City of Glasgow Union Railway before it was closed in 1968 in the wake of the Beeching Axe. The wall of the goods warehouse with its distinctive arched windows still faces onto this section of Duke Street, preserved as part of a new office block within the Collegelands development, which also includes a multi-storey car park, student accommodation and a hotel.

Glasgow's infantry barracks was also built adjacent to the University, between Duke Street and the Gallowgate, in 1795. It could accommodate up to 1,000 men but, by the mid-19th century, the buildings were in a dire condition. In 1872, new barracks were completed in the suburb of Maryhill. The site was also used as part of the College goods yard site.

The new Glasgow Meat Market and Abattoir was opened at the corner of Duke Street and Bellgrove Street in Calton, in the 1970s after the original meat market in the nearby Gallowgate, which dated from 1879, closed. It operated for many years as a car auction. The new meat market closed in July 2001 and was demolished in 2007, with new residential developments being constructed on the site. The old market's two listed Victorian entrance archways were retained.

From 1798 to 1957, Duke Street was best known for being the location of Duke Street Prison before it was demolished in 1958, making way for the Ladywell housing scheme built on the site from 1961 to 1964. The only remaining structure of Duke Street Prison is some of the boundary wall.

Today, landmarks on Duke Street include the A-listed Ladywell Business Centre, originally designed by John Burnet in 1858 as the Alexanders Endowed School, Tennents' Wellpark Brewery, the nearby Glasgow Necropolis and the A-listed former Sydney Place United Presbyterian Church, which was damaged in a fire but was restored by the Glasgow Building Preservation Trust in 1996 as an extension to the Wellpark Enterprise Centre. There is also a large British Bakeries factory and the Great Eastern Hotel at no. 100, which was a notorious common lodging house but has since been converted into apartments. There was also the Eastern District Hospital, latterly known as Duke Street Hospital, before it closed 1994. The main building was converted into flats, but is now vacant. The area is served by High Street railway station, Bellgrove railway station and Duke Street railway station.

See also
Glasgow tower blocks

References

External links

Streets in Glasgow
Parkhead
History of Glasgow